Bad Rud (also Romanized as Bād Rūd; also known as Vārū) is a village in Shahrabad Rural District, in the Central District of Firuzkuh County, Tehran Province, Iran. At the 2006 census, its population was 248, in 74 families.

References 

Populated places in Firuzkuh County